Vohimanga is a town and commune in Madagascar. It belongs to the district of Bekily, which is a part of Androy Region. The population of the commune was estimated to be approximately 9,000 in 2001 commune census.

Only primary schooling is available. The majority 100% of the population of the commune are farmers.  The most important crops are cassava and rice; also peanuts are an important agricultural product.

References and notes 

Populated places in Androy